Mansourah ( - „victorious“) is a town and commune in Tlemcen Province in Northwestern Algeria. The town is the seat of Mansourah District.

Population
According to the 2008 census the town has population of 49,007 inhabitants and totally its commune has 49,150 inhabitants.

The town is effectively a suburb of the provincial capital Tlemcen. Mansourah and Tlemcen form together an intercommunal urban agglomeration with 173,531 inhabitants.

History
The settlement was founded by the Marinids in 1303 AD as a fortified base for their siege of Tlemcen. The site quickly grew into a large city with tens of thousands of inhabitants.

Landmarks
The main landmark of Mansourah is the Tlemcen National Park with the ruins of the fortified city and the Mansourah Mosque. They include parts of the walls of the city, better preserved walls of the castle and its leading tower.

Localities
The commune of Mansourah is composed of 8 localities (1984):

Mansourah
Imama
Béni Boublène
Wone Ouest
ZHUN Champ de tir
Kifan Sud-Ouest
Attar
Ouali Mustapha (Riat El Kébir)

References

Communes of Tlemcen Province
Cities in Algeria
Algeria